Lee Hsin-han and Lu Yen-hsun were the defending champions but chose not to defend their title.

Sanchai and Sonchat Ratiwatana won the title after defeating Austin Krajicek and Jackson Withrow 6–4, 5–7, [10–5] in the final.

Seeds

Draw

References
 Main Draw

Men's Doubles 
Hua Hin Championships - Doubles
 in Thai tennis